The 2011 Men's South American Volleyball Championship was the 29th edition of the tournament, organised by CSV. It was held in Cuiabá, Brazil from 19 to 25 September 2011. The top two teams qualified for the 2011 World Cup.

Teams
 (Hosts)

Venues
 Ginásio Aecim Tocantins, Cuiabá, Brazil – All matches (excl. Colombia vs. Uruguay on 25 September)
 Ginásio da UFMT, Cuiabá, Brazil – Colombia vs. Uruguay on 25 September

Round robin
All times are Brasília Time –1 (UTC−04:00).

|}

|}

Final standing

Awards

Most Valuable Player
  Sérgio Santos
Best Spiker
  Dante Amaral
Best Blocker
  Sebastian Solé
Best Server
  Kervin Piñerua

Best Digger
  Sérgio Santos
Best Setter
  Luciano De Cecco
Best Receiver
  Sérgio Santos
Best Libero
  Sérgio Santos

External links
Organizer website

Men's South American Volleyball Championships
S
Men's South American Volleyball Championship
2011 in South American sport
International volleyball competitions hosted by Brazil
September 2011 sports events in South America